Palazzo Canavese is a comune (municipality) in the Metropolitan City of Turin in the Italian region Piedmont, located about  northeast of Turin.

Palazzo Canavese borders the following municipalities: Bollengo, Piverone, Magnano, Albiano d'Ivrea, and Azeglio.

References

Cities and towns in Piedmont